Leptomydinae is a subfamily of mydas flies in the family Mydidae. There are at least 6 genera and more than 50 described species in Leptomydinae.

Genera
These genera belong to the subfamily Leptomydinae:
 Eremomidas Semenov, 1896
 Hessemydas Kondratieff, Carr and Irwin, 2005
 Leptomydas Gerstaecker, 1868
 Nemomydas Curran, 1934
 Plyomydas Wilcox and Papavero, 1971
 Pseudonomoneura Bequaert, 1961

References

Further reading

 

Mydidae
Brachycera subfamilies